was a town located in Numakuma District, Hiroshima Prefecture, Japan.

As of 2003, the town had an estimated population of 12,511 and a density of 404.49 persons per km2. The total area was 30.93 km2.

On February 1, 2005, Numakuma was merged into the expanded city of Fukuyama.

Dissolved municipalities of Hiroshima Prefecture